"Sayang Naman" (English: "What a Waste") is a song by the Filipino singer Nina. It was written by Emil Pama and produced by Ferdie Marquez and the R&B singer Mike Luis for Nina's second album, Smile (2003). It was released as the album's third single in the second quarter of 2004 in the Philippines. It is Nina's only Tagalog language single.

Release 
It was the last single for the album. A fan requested the song to be the next single after the smash hits of "Make You Mine" and "A Girl Can Dream". Though the song failed to establish the same impact as the previous hits, it was praised for its ability to maintain consistency with the album's focus. The whistle register is very evident in the song and is considered one of Nina's powerful songs when it comes to using the whistle register.

Video 
Special effects are used all the time in the video with Nina seen as part of a mail being sent to a loved one. It is the first video with only Nina.

References

2004 singles
Nina Girado songs
2003 songs
Warner Music Group singles
Tagalog-language songs